Meghan McDonald (born 29 June 1991) is an Australian rules footballer with the Geelong Football Club in the AFL Women's competition (AFLW). She previously played with the Western Bulldogs in the 2017 season. McDonald was recruited by the Western Bulldogs as a free agent in November 2016. She played four matches in her debut season and kicked one goal. She was delisted at the conclusion of the 2017 season. In September 2018 she accepted a contract with Geelong to play in the club's inaugural season in the AFLW in 2019. She was awarded Geelong's best and fairest medal in her debut season at the club. In December 2020, McDonald was announced as Geelong's captain, replacing Melissa Hickey who retired at the end of the 2020 season. In the 2021 AFL Women's season, McDonald was awarded with her second All-Australian blazer, named on the full back position. McDonald achieved selection in Champion Data's 2021 AFLW All-Star stats team, after leading the league for average intercept possessions in the 2021 AFL Women's season, totalling 8.3 a game.

Statistics
Statistics are correct to the end of the 2021 season.

|- style="background:#EAEAEA"
| scope="row" text-align:center | 2017
| 
| 15 || 4 || 1 || 2 || 9 || 7 || 16 || 9 || 3 || 0.3 || 0.5 || 2.3 || 1.8 || 4.0 || 2.3 || 0.8 || 0
|-
| scope="row" text-align:center | 2018
| –
| – || – || – || – || – || – || – || – || – || – || – || – || – || – || – || – || –
|- style="background:#EAEAEA"
| scope="row" text-align:center | 2019
| 
| 11 || 8 || 0 || 0 || 80 || 46 || 126 || 21 || 10 || 0.0 || 0.0 || 10.0 || 5.8 || 15.8 || 2.6 || 1.3 || 0
|- 
| scope=row | 2020 ||  || 11
| 6 || 1 || 0 || 43 || 14 || 57 || 16 || 8 || 0.3 || 0.0 || 10.8 || 3.5 || 14.3 || 4.0 || 2.0 || 1
|- style=background:#EAEAEA
| scope=row text-align:center | 2021 ||  || 11
| 7 || 0 || 0 || 92 || 39 || 131 || 28 || 14 || 0.0 || 0.0 || 10.2 || 4.3 || 14.6 || 3.1 || 1.6 || 2
|- class="sortbottom"
! colspan=3 | Career
! 25
! 2
! 2
! 224
! 106
! 330
! 74
! 35
! 0.1
! 0.1
! 9.0
! 4.2
! 13.2
! 3.0
! 1.4
! 1
|}

References

External links 

1991 births
Living people
Western Bulldogs (AFLW) players
Australian rules footballers from Victoria (Australia)
Geelong Football Club (AFLW) players
Darebin Falcons players